PD, P.D., or Pd may refer to:

Arts and media
 People's Democracy (newspaper), weekly organ of the Communist Party of India (Marxist)
 The Plain Dealer, a Cleveland, Ohio, US newspaper
 Post Diaspora, a time frame in the Honorverse series of science fiction novels
 Principia Discordia, a 1965 holy text in Discordianism
 Production designer, a profession in film or television
 Production diary, a promotional video podcast
 Public domain, a copyright status

Economics and business
 Personnel department, of an organization
 Price discrimination, a microeconomic pricing strategy
 Probability of default, used in finance (Basel II)
 Professional degree, or first professional degree
 Professional development, learning to earn or maintain professional credentials
 Program director, in service industries
 Public Debt, of a government

Organizations

Companies
 Phelps Dodge, a former American mining company, now part of Freeport-McMoRan
 Polyphony Digital, developer of the Gran Turismo video game series
 Porter Airlines (IATA airline designator), a regional airline headquartered at Billy Bishop Toronto City Airport, Canada

Government and law
 Police department
 Preventive detention, an imprisonment that is putatively justified for non-punitive purposes
 Property damage liability, in insurance
 Public defender, an attorney appointed to represent people who cannot afford to hire one
 Public domain, works whose exclusive intellectual property rights are no longer valid
 Punitive damages

Political parties
 Democratic Party of Albania (Partia Demokratike), a centre-right political party in Albania
 Democratic Party (Indonesia) (Partai Demokrat), a political party in Indonesia
 Democratic Party (Italy) (Partito Democratico), a centre-left political party in Italy
 Democratic Party (Malta) (Partit Demokratiku), a centre-left political party in Malta
 Democratic Party (Romania) (Partidul Democrat), a social-democratic and, later, a centre-right political party in Romania
 Democratic Party – demokraci.pl (Partia Demokratyczna – demokraci.pl), Poland
 Party of Democrats (Partito dei Democratici), a defunct political party in San Marino
 People's Democracy (Ireland), a defunct political organization in Ireland
 Progressive Democrats, a defunct political party in the Republic of Ireland

Places
 Province of Padua (ISO 3166-2:IT), Italy 
 Port Dickson (town), a coastal city in Negeri Sembilan, Malaysia

Professions
 Doctor of Pharmacy, also abbreviated PharmD
 Postdoctoral, a research position or course of study
 Privatdozent, a title or position especially in German universities
 Production designer, a profession in film or television

Science and technology

Medicine
 Paleolithic diet, a diet based on presumed ancient diets
 Panic disorder, a condition with excessive fear or anxiety
 Parkinson's disease, a degenerative neurological condition
 Paroxysmal dyskinesia, a group of movement disorders
 Pediatric dentistry, mouth health care and tooth repair for children
 Peritoneal dialysis, a way to filter the blood when the kidneys are not working well
 Personality disorder, any of various psychiatric problems
 Peyronie's disease, a connective tissue disorder involving the growth of fibrous plaques in the soft tissue of the penis
 Pharmacodynamics, the study of how a drug affects an organism
 Phenyldichloroarsine, a blister agent and vomiting agent
 Polydipsia, excessive thirst
 Progressive disease, a disease that continues to worsen and often has no proven total cure
 Psychotic depression, a major depressive episode that is accompanied by psychotic symptoms
 Pupillary distance, in optometry

Computing
 Pentium D, a dual-core variant of the Pentium 4 processor
 Perfect Dark (P2P), a Japanese peer-to-peer file-sharing (P2P) application designed for use with Microsoft Windows
 Phase-change Dual, an optical media format
 Pure Data, the graphical audio-processing language
 USB PD (USB Power Delivery), an extension of the USB standard

Physics
 Photodiode, a semiconductor device that converts light into current
 Potential difference, or voltage
 Partial discharge, an undesirable discharge phenomenon in high voltage dielectrics

Other uses in science and technology
 PD resistor, a pull-down resistor
 Pd test, the outcome of using a drop of para-phenylenediamine (also abbr. "Pd") to identify lichens
 Palladium, symbol Pd, a chemical element
 Point-defence, a category of weapons
 Axiom of projective determinacy, in mathematical logic
 Pumpe Düse, a Volkswagen Group name for Unit Injector diesel engine technology

Other uses
 The NYSE ticker symbol of PagerDuty
 Padang railway station, West Sumatra, Indonesia (station code)
 Full stop (or period, in American English), used in coded military communications
 Personal development, as used in the self-help and personal growth requiring fields
 peu difficile, in mountaineering, "little difficult" climbing grade International French adjectival system

See also
 PD-50, a 1979 currently non-floating floating dry dock made in Sweden
 PD Draw, a bridge over the Passaic River, New Jersey, US
 PD-1, a cell surface receptor protein
 pd, the nickname of Brent Scott, the founder of the website Insex
 Pee Dee
 Pound (mass)
 Pulldown (disambiguation)